Ma'barot, often called Ma'abarot, is a kibbutz in Emek Hefer in central Israel.

History
Ma'barot was the third kibbutz established by the Kibbutz Artzi federation and is located in the Sharon Plain, near the old road from Petah Tikva to Haifa. It was founded by members of the left-wing Hashomer Hatzair Zionist youth movement in Romania who organized themselves as a settlement group, and immigrated to Mandate Palestine in 1924.

Upon their arrival in Palestine, the group waited several years until land for settlement was available. They worked as hired laborers in the meanwhile. In 1932, a large stretch of land in the Wadi Hawarith/Hefer Valley area was acquired by the Jewish National Fund of which a small part was given to the settlement group. Ten members established an initial presence on the land, constructing housing and farm buildings, and making a start in land amelioration, while the rest of the group continued its communal life in Hadera. In September 1933, they too moved to the site of Ma'barot, which was located in a swampy area near Nahal Alexander.

Over the following years, the kibbutz membership was augmented by additional Hashomer Hatzair groups, from Bulgaria, Hungary, Germany (of which most members were Russian), and Chile.

Economy
In contrast to most other kibbutzim, which have embraced privatization and have done away with many of the communal aspects that historically characterized kibbutz life, Ma'barot remains heavily collectivized. There are no differential wages, with all members living off a budget that does not include any special compensation for work, the communal dining hall still operates, and over thirty committees regulate almost every aspect of life on the kibbutz.

Ma'barot farms approximately 3,000 dunams (3 km²) of land. Cotton is the major cash crop, and other branches include subtropical orchard, fish-breeding ponds and a dairy barn. The kibbutz also operates three factories, two pharmaceutical factories and one metal factory:
 "TRIMA", which produces medical supplies
 "Ma'abarot Products", which manufactures veterinary medical supplies and feed additives for livestock, among them "BONZO" dog food and "LaCat" cat food.
 "Metal Ma'barot", which designs and manufactures industrial machinery for use in factories.

In addition, Ma'barot runs a drying plant that dehydrates a variety of foods. Foremost among these is Materna, a leading Israeli brand of infant formula. In 2017, the kibbutz sold its remaining 49% share in Materna to Osem-Nestle for $156 million.

Culture
In 1944, Nissim Nissimov, a composer with ties to the Labor movement organized a musical show inspired by the Song of Songs.  In 1955, the  French cellist Paul Tortelier, impressed by the ideals of the kibbutzim, spent a year at Ma'barot  with his family. He composed "Israeli Symphony" based on his experiences.

Archaeology
Burial caves and artifacts from prehistoric settlements have been found on the grounds of the kibbutz.

Notable people
 Geva Alon, musician

References

External links
Official website of the kibbutz (Hebrew)
 Ruvik Feigin, 2013 Documentary on the founding of  Hashomer Hatzair Kibbutz, ca. 11 kilometers north of Netanya
On the lawn of Kibbutz Ma'abarot, documentary film
Pictures on Flickr.com of international volunteers working in Ma'Abarot in the 1970s

Kibbutzim
Kibbutz Movement
Populated places established in 1933
1933 establishments in Mandatory Palestine
Populated places in Central District (Israel)
Romanian-Jewish culture in Israel